Malmesbury is a town of approximately 36,000 inhabitants in the Western Cape province of South Africa, about 65 km north of Cape Town.

The town is the largest in the Swartland (‘black land’) which took its name from the Renosterbos ('rhino bush'), an indigenous plant that turns black in the warm, dry summers. The area is especially known for its grain and wine cultivation as well as sheep and poultry farming.

Malmesbury was named after Sir Lowry Cole's father-in-law, the Earl of Malmesbury. Settlers were encouraged to make their homes here because of a tepid sulphur chloride mineral spring that was renowned for curing rheumatism. The first farms were allocated in 1703.
When the fifth Dutch Reformed congregation in the Cape was established here, it became known as Zwartlands-kerk (Swartland Church) but was renamed Malmesbury in 1829. The town acquired municipal status in 1860. 

The town no longer attracts the ailing because this aspect was never developed by the local authority, and today a shopping centre is located on top of the site with only a decorative fountain marking the location of the original spring.

Notable people from Malmesbury
 McNeil Hendricks
 Maggie Laubser
 Pieter-Steph du Toit
 Johan du Toit

Demographics

In 1911 the Encyclopædia Britannica recorded the population of the town at 3,811, however this may refer to a white population, as a census of 1849 recorded a total of 8,520 residents. The 1939 edition of the official statistical Year Book of South Africa records a total population of 4,856, with roughly half the population recorded as white (2,574) and half recorded as coloured (2,221).

The following statistics describing Malmesbury are from the 2011 census.

 Area: 
 Population: 35,897: 
 Households: 9,473:

Transport 

Malmesbury lies along the N7 highway “Cape Namibia Route” which bypasses the town centre to the west and runs from Cape Town in the south-west to Moorreesburg in the north. The N7 has two on and off-ramps interchanges in Malmesbury including the R615 interchange (Exit 65) west of the town centre  and the R45 interchange (Exit 68) north-west of the town centre.

Malmesbury is also has at the centre of three regional routes including the R45 which passes through the town as “Loedolf Street” and “Piet Retief Street” from Paarl in the south-east to Vredenburg in the north-west, the R302 which passes through the town as its main street named “Voortrekker Road” from Durbanville in the south, and the R315 which passes through the town “Bokomo Street” from Darling in the north-west.

Coats of arms
Municipality — Malmesbury was a municipality in its own right from 1860 to 2000.  By 1931, the council had adopted an emblem depicting a plough in front of a sheaf of wheat, surrounded by a buckled strap inscribed Deo frumentoque vires.  This device was depicted on a cigarette card issued in 1931.

In 1963, the council assumed a coat of arms, designed by Cornelis Pama.  It registered the arms with the Cape Provincial Administration in December 1963, had them formally granted by the provincial administrator on 8 July 1966 and registered them at the Bureau of Heraldry in September 1969.

The arms were : Per chevron Sable and Gules,  a  chevron  ermine between in chief two garbs and in base a sea-lion Or.  In layman's terms : the shield was divided by an ermine chevron, the upper half displaying two golden sheaves of wheat on a black background and the lower half a golden heraldic sea-lion on a red background.  The sea-lion was evidently derived from the arms of Gustaaf Willem van Imhoff, who established the church from which the town developed.

The crest was an upright spade between two rhenosterbos  branches, and the motto, once again, was Deo frumentoque vires.

Divisional council — The Malmesbury divisional council, which administered the rural areas of the district outside the town, assumed a coat of arms, designed by Ivan Mitford-Barberton, on 24 June 1958.

The arms were : Per fess Sable and Azure, a fess wavy Gules fimbriated Argent between in chief an eagle displayed between two ears of wheat palewise Or and in base a sea-lion naiant per pale Or and Argent.  In layman's terms : the shield was divided horizontally into black and blue and displayed, from top to bottom, a golden eagle between two sheaves of wheat, a red wavy stripe edged in silver, and a gold and silver heraldic sea-lion.

Sport

Mother City SkyDiving operates out of a private airfield 12 km to the north of Malmesbury and provides a service for experienced sport skydivers, and offers Tandem Introductory Skydiving.

Malmesbury has a variety of Sports Facilities including a Golf, Rugby & Bowling Club. The international organisation Parkrun hosts a regular 5 km run for anyone to join for free.

References

Populated places established in 1745
Populated places in the Swartland Local Municipality
1745 establishments in the Dutch Empire